Tareq Al-Esmaeili (born 3 March 1977) is a Qatari cyclist.

Palmares
2004
 National Road Race Champion
2009
 National Road Race Champion
 National Cross Country Champion

References

1977 births
Living people
Qatari male cyclists
Cyclists at the 2006 Asian Games
Cyclists at the 2010 Asian Games
Asian Games competitors for Qatar